Everybody Was in the French Resistance...Now! are a band dedicated to writing responses to popular songs, featuring Eddie Argos of Art Brut and Dyan Valdés of The Blood Arm. They have released one album, Fixin' the Charts, Vol. 1 in 2010.

History 
Eddie Argos announced the band on his blog in 2008, stating that this was a response to Avril Lavigne attempting to "steal men from happy and loving relationships," a sardonic reference to her song "Girlfriend". Eddie Argos is a renowned 'music geek', and took the opportunity to reply to several songs on this project, from 60's soul numbers on "Hey, It's Jimmy Mack", to Kanye West on "Coal Digger".

It is currently not clear if the band was a one off side project, or if there are plans for a second album, although it has been mentioned in passing on Eddie Argos' blog.

Fixin' the Charts, Vol. 1 

Everybody Was in the French Resistance...Now!'s album was recorded in Joshua Tree, California, and was produced by David Newton (guitarist) of The Mighty Lemon Drops. The 12 tracks reply to a wide variety of songs, and often take a completely different tack to the original, for example, where Creeque Alley by The Mamas and the Papas sang about the history of the band and the California music scene of the time, Creque Allies is a potted history of the French Resistance in World War II.

Critical reception 

The album received mixed reviews in the media. Pitchfork, who are normally favourable to Argos' main band Art Brut stated that it was "for obsessives only", and of the concept that, "a mildly amusing Myspace click can lead to a painfully obnoxious album." It was also variously described as "half finished", and "disposable" However, Spin magazine gave the album 7/10, referring to Eddie as "one of his generation's great poets of the mundane".

However, some songs on the album were praised individually in the same reviews, for example He's a Rebel was regarded as "Funny and witty", and Stereogum referred to Argos as "Indie rock's thick-browed sardonic clown prince.". Contact Music's largely negative review did concede that, "There are moments of pitch perfect piano pop".

Track listing

Personnel 
 Eddie Argos – Vocals
 Dyan Valdés – Vocals, piano, composer
 David Newton – Producer, guitar, bass
 Louis Castle – Trumpet
 Nick Armoroso – Drums
 Bekki Newton – Vocals
 Dave Schultz – Mastering

References 

English indie rock groups
Musical groups from London